Džemal "Džemo" Smječanin (born 6 June 1972) is a Bosnian retired professional footballer who played as a forward.

Club career
Born in Sarajevo, SFR Yugoslavia, present day Bosnia and Herzegovina, Smječanin started playing football in the youth teams of hometown club by the same name, Sarajevo. His first professional contract that he signed was with now defunct Slovenian club Korotan Prevalje in the summer of 1995. He spent one season playing in Slovenia, before coming back to Bosnia and Herzegovina and signing with his favourite Sarajevo in 1996. Smječanin played for three years at Sarajevo, winning two Bosnian Cups, one Bosnian Supercup and one league title during that time.

In 1999, he joined Đerzelez, and in the season 1999–2000 scored 25 league goals for the club, making him joint-top goalscorer of the league. From 2000 until 2002, Smječanin played abroad at German and Belgium clubs Rot-Weiss Essen and Zuid-West-Vlaanderen. However, after leaving Đerzelez, he was not able to get back to his goalscoring ways for the rest of his career, scoring only 2 league goals in the two years that he played at Essen and Vlaanderen.

In June 2002, Smječanin came back to Sarajevo, playing one more season for his boyhood club before retiring from football in June 2003 after the end of the 2002–03 league season.

International career
Showing good games at Sarajevo, Smječanin was called up to the Bosnia and Herzegovina national team squad for the 1997 Dunhill Cup in Malaysia by national team head coach Fuad Muzurović. He played all five games at the Cup, scoring one goal against Vietnam in a 4–0 win on 22 February 1997. Smječanin played his last game for the national team against Tunisia in a 2–1 loss on 5 November 1997.

Career statistics

International
Source:

International goals

Honours

Player
Sarajevo
First League of Bosnia and Herzegovina: 1998–99
Bosnian Cup: 1996–97, 1997–98
Bosnian Supercup: 1997

Individual
Performance
First League of Bosnia and Herzegovina Top Goalscorer: 1999–2000 (25 goals)

References

External links

1972 births
Living people
Footballers from Sarajevo
Bosniaks of Bosnia and Herzegovina
Association football forwards
Bosnia and Herzegovina footballers
Bosnia and Herzegovina international footballers
NK Korotan Prevalje players
FK Sarajevo players
Rot-Weiss Essen players
K.R.C. Zuid-West-Vlaanderen players
Slovenian PrvaLiga players
Regionalliga players
Challenger Pro League players
Premier League of Bosnia and Herzegovina players
Bosnia and Herzegovina expatriate footballers
Expatriate footballers in Slovenia
Bosnia and Herzegovina expatriate sportspeople in Slovenia
Expatriate footballers in Germany
Bosnia and Herzegovina expatriate sportspeople in Germany
Expatriate footballers in Belgium
Bosnia and Herzegovina expatriate sportspeople in Belgium